Vice Admiral Martin John Connell,  (born 1968) is a senior Royal Navy officer currently serving as Second Sea Lord.

Naval career
Connell joined the Royal Navy in 1987 as a Lynx Observer. He then went on to become a Qualified Observer Instructor (QOI) at 702 Naval Air Squadron before becoming a Flight Commander on HMS Coventry and HMS Manchester, before instructing observers on 815 Naval Air Squadron. He was given command of the offshore patrol vessel  in 2003, of the frigate  in 2006, in which role he was deployed on Operation Telic, and of the aircraft carrier  in 2012.

Connell was promoted to commodore on 10 February 2015. He went on to be appointed Commander Amphibious Task Group in 2015, and naval attaché in Washington, D.C. in 2016. Since 2019, he has served as Assistant Chief of Naval Staff (Aviation, Amphibious Capability & Carriers) as well as head of the Fleet Air Arm. He is a recipient of the Naval Long Service and Good Conduct Medal with one clasp.

Connell was appointed Commander of the Order of the British Empire (CBE) in the 2020 New Year Honours.

Until 2022 he was serving as Director Force Generation under the Fleet Commander. On 14 January 2022, newly promoted Rear Admiral Steve Moorhouse became Director Force Generation as Connell was promoted and appointed as Second Sea Lord.

It was announced in January 2022, that Connell would become Second Sea Lord taking over from Vice Admiral Nick Hine. On 12 January 2022, Connell formally took over as Second Sea Lord.

References

 

 
 

|-

1968 births
Fleet Air Arm aviators
Living people
Royal Navy vice admirals
Royal Navy personnel of the Gulf War
Royal Navy personnel of the Iraq War
Royal Navy personnel of the War in Afghanistan (2001–2021)
Commanders of the Order of the British Empire
Military personnel from Yorkshire